The Asian Indoor and Martial Arts Games (abbreviated as AIMAG) is a pancontinental multi-sport event held every four years among athletes from all over Asia. It is organised by the Olympic Council of Asia (OCA) and consists of Indoor and martial arts events with TV broadcasting potential, some of which were not contested at the Asian Games and Asian Winter Games Programs and are not Olympic sports.

The event is a merger of two formerly separate OCA-sanctioned events – Asian Indoor Games (abbreviated as AIG) and Asian Martial Arts Games (abbreviated as AMAG), first held in Bangkok, Thailand in 2005 and 2009 respectively. Both events merged to form the present-day event in 2013, with the subsequent editions inherited the edition numeral of the former. These Games are described as the second largest Asian multi-sport event after the Asian Games.

In its history, five nations have hosted the Asian Indoor and Martial Arts Games and sixty-three nations from Asia and Oceania and two teams have participated in the event. The last Games were held in Ashgabat, Turkmenistan 17–27 September 2017, while the next edition are scheduled to be held in Thailand between 17 and 26 November 2023.

Participating nations
All 45 countries whose National Olympic Committees are recognized by the Olympic Council of Asia and 18 countries whose National Olympic Committees are recognized by the Oceania National Olympic Committees.

Asia

Oceania

Others

List of Asian Indoor and Martial Arts Games

Sports

All-time medal table

See also
 Asian Games
 Asian Winter Games
 Asian Beach Games
 Asian Youth Games

References

External links
 

 
Asian international sports competitions
Indoor sports competitions
Martial arts competitions
Multi-sport events in Asia
Olympic Council of Asia